Boulder is an unincorporated community in Barbour County, West Virginia, United States. It is located on county route 11 along the Buckhannon River, about three miles from the community of Audra. While the official name of the community is Boulder, by which it is usually known, the town's now-defunct post office assumed the name of Rangoon due to confusion with the town of Boulder, Colorado.

The community takes its name from natural boulders along the nearby Buckhannon River.

See also
Audra, West Virginia
Audra State Park

References

Unincorporated communities in Barbour County, West Virginia
Unincorporated communities in West Virginia